Khal Nayak is a 1993 Indian Hindi-language action crime film written, directed and produced by Subhash Ghai under Mukta Arts Ltd. The film stars Sanjay Dutt (as antihero), Madhuri Dixit and Jackie Shroff. The plot focuses on the escape and attempted capture of criminal Ballu (Dutt) by Inspector Ram (Shroff) and his cop girlfriend Ganga (Dixit). 

Khal Nayak is known for its music, especially the song "Choli Ke Peeche Kya Hai", sung by Alka Yagnik and Ila Arun. The Khal Nayak soundtrack album sold 10million copies, making it one of the year's best-selling Bollywood soundtrack albums, along with Baazigar. Khal Nayak released on 6 August 1993, and became the second highest grossing Hindi film of 1993, surpassed only by Aankhen. It received positive reviews from critics, with praise for its screenplay, soundtrack and performances of the cast. 

At the 39th Filmfare Awards, Khal Nayak received a leading 11 nominations, including Best Film, Best Director (Ghai), Best Actor (Dutt), Best Actress (Dixit) and Best Supporting Actor (Shroff), and won 2 awards – Best Female Playback Singer (Alka Yagnik and Ila Arun) and Best Choreography (Saroj Khan), both for the song "Choli Ke Peeche Kya Hai".

Plot
Balram "Ballu" Prasad, a gangster gets arrested by Inspector Ram, who shows compassion to Ballu while trying to receive information that would lead to the capture of Ballu's mentor  Roshida. However, Ballu doesn't speak and later promises to escape from prison. While visiting his officer girlfriend Ganga, Ram learns that Ballu has escaped from prison and his reputation is in tatters as the media portrays him as an duty-neglected officer. In an attempt to restore Ram's reputation, Ganga goes undercover as a street-girl, and realizes that Ballu is a kind-hearted person, who turned to crime business due to poverty and circumstances, and tries to rehabilitate him while on the run. 

Meanwhile, Ballu begins to fall in love with Ganga, but becomes enraged when he finds out she doesn't love him and is a cop. Ganga continues to help Ballu as she has seen good in him. Meanwhile, Ram approaches Ballu's mother for help and realises that Ballu is actually his childhood friend. Ballu's mother and Ballu reveals that Roshan Da used their poverty to corrupt Ballu and had killed Ballu's sister where he placed the blame on the cops. Enraged, Ballu kills the officer thus gets spiraled into a life of crime. Afraid that the police will kill Ballu, Ganga stops the police from shooting him, allowing him to escape, where she is arrested for aiding a criminal and is accused of being in a relationship with Ballu, which destroys her professional and personal reputation. 

Ballu's mother finds him, while she is followed by Ram. In the following confrontation, Ballu's mother takes Ram's side trying to convince Ballu to surrender. Seeing Ganga's picture in Ram's wallet, Ballu realizes that Ram is the one who she loves and manages to escape to Roshan Da's base where Roshan Da promises to help him escape, but betrays him and attempts to kill him and his mother. Under the leadership of Ram, the cops attack Roshan Da's lair. In the ensuing conflict, Ballu finds out that Roshan Da killed his sister, where Ram kills Roshan Da and Ballu escapes. Following Roshan Da's death, Ballu claims himself as the new boss, but his girlfriend informs him that Ganga is about to go on trial for aiding him. Having a change of heart, Ballu surrenders himself and swears that Ganga is innocent, thereby restoring her reputation and reconciling her and Ram and Ballu goes to prison.

Cast
Sanjay Dutt as Balaram "Ballu" Prasad
Madhuri Dixit as Inspector Gangotri "Ganga" Agnihotri
Jackie Shroff as Inspector Ram Kumar Sinha
Anupam Kher as Ishwar Pandey
Rakhee Gulzar as Aarti Prasad,Ballu's Mother  
Siddharth Randeria as Navin Prasad , Public Prosecutor Lawyer , Ballu's Father
Aloka Mukherjee as Sunita Prasad ,Ballu's Sister
Ramya Krishna as Sophia Sulochana
Pramod Moutho as Roshan Mahanta
Sushmita Mukherjee as Mrs. Maithili Pandey
Navtej Hundal
Arun Bali as Police Commissioner Kuljeet Chaddha
Anand Balraj as Police Inspector 
A. K. Hangal as Shaukat Bhai
Sudhir Dalvi as Shambhu Master, Village School Teacher. (special appearance)
Neena Gupta as Champa, a dancer in the song "Choli Ke Peeche"
Ali Asgar as Munna
Sunil Shende as Judge (Last Scene of Movie)
Hans Dev Sharma as Investigation Officer assistant to Ram Kumar Sinha.

Awards
39th Filmfare Awards:

Won
Best Female Playback Singer – Alka Yagnik and Ila Arun for "Choli Ke Peeche Kya Hai"
 Best Choreography – Saroj Khan for "Choli Ke Peeche"

Nominated
 Best Film
 Best Director – Subhash Ghai
 Best Actor – Sanjay Dutt
 Best Actress – Madhuri Dixit
 Best Supporting Actor – Jackie Shroff
 Best Music Director – Laxmikant–Pyarelal
 Best Lyricist – Anand Bakshi for "Choli Ke Peeche Kya Hai"
 Best Male Playback Singer – Vinod Rathod for "Nayak Nahin Khal Nayak Hoon Main"
Best Female Playback Singer – Alka Yagnik for "Paalki Pe Ho Ke Sawaar"

Music
The music was composed by Laxmikant–Pyarelal, with the lyrics being penned by Anand Bakshi.

The best known song from the soundtrack were "Choli Ke Peeche Kya Hai", "Palki Mein Hoke Sawar" and "Nayak Nahi Khal Nayak". The Khal Nayak soundtrack album sold 10million copies, making it one of the year's best-selling Bollywood soundtrack albums, along with Baazigar.

Box office
Khal Nayak was the second highest grossing Hindi film of 1993, surpassed only by Aankhen.

Remakes
The film was remade in Telugu as Khaidi No. 1, and in Tamil as Hero (1994).

References

External links
 
 Mumbai Mirror – "When the Bad Guy Ruled the Box Office"

1993 films
1990s Hindi-language films
Indian crime action films
1990s masala films
1990s crime action films
Films scored by Laxmikant–Pyarelal
Films directed by Subhash Ghai
Hindi films remade in other languages
Films about terrorism in India
Indian prison films